Living Legend is a 1975 jazz album by saxophonist Art Pepper playing with Hampton Hawes, Charlie Haden and Shelly Manne.

This was Art Pepper's "comeback" album, the first to be released after his long absence due to drug addiction and incarceration in San Quentin prison. Pepper had been finally released in 1966 and for a while only played tenor saxophone, showing how much of an influence John Coltrane had been on him in the intervening years. In 1968 Buddy Rich asked him to join his big band on alto; Pepper borrowed an alto and, in his words, quoted in the sleeve notes to this album, "discovered I was able to say everything I wanted to say and I didn't have to sacrifice my individuality to be accepted or to be modern".

Following two operations for a ruptured spleen, Pepper moved into Synanon, a rehabilitation centre for recovering addicts, and began the slow return to full-time performing and recording.

Reception

AllMusic reviewer Scott Yanow awarded the album 4 stars, writing that "Pepper displays a more explorative and darker style than he had previously. He also shows a greater emotional depth in his improvisations and was open to some of the innovations of the avant-garde in his search for greater self-expression."

Track listing
"Ophelia" – 7:51
"Here's That Rainy Day" (Johnny Burke, Jimmy Van Heusen) – 5:40
"What Laurie Likes" – 6:45
"Mr. Yohe" – 7:10
"Lost Life" – 5:52
"Samba Mom-Mom" – 8:23
(Recorded on 9 August 1975.)
All songs written by Art Pepper unless otherwise noted.

Personnel
Art Pepper – alto saxophone
Hampton Hawes – piano, electric piano
Charlie Haden – bass
Shelly Manne – drums

References

Richard Cook & Brian Morton. The Penguin Guide to Jazz on CD 4th edition. Penguin, 1998. 

1975 albums
Art Pepper albums